Jamnik is a settlement on the eastern slopes of the Jelovica Plateau in the Municipality of Kranj in the Upper Carniola region of Slovenia.

Church

The local church just outside the village, dedicated to Saints Primus and Felician, is built at an impressive location on a hill overlooking most of the northern part of the Ljubljana Basin with the Julian Alps as a backdrop towards the northwest and the Kamnik–Savinja Alps towards the east.

References

External links

Jamnik at Geopedia

Populated places in the City Municipality of Kranj